Baraghush (also Romanized as Barāghūsh; also known as Barāqūsh) is a village in Alan Baraghush Rural District, Mehraban District, Sarab County, East Azerbaijan Province, Iran. At the 2006 census, its population was 974, in 242 families.

References 

Populated places in Sarab County